List of Guggenheim Fellowships awarded in 1929.

1929 U.S. and Canadian Fellows

See also
 Guggenheim Fellowship
 List of Guggenheim Fellowships awarded in 1928
 List of Guggenheim Fellowships awarded in 1930

References

1929
1929 awards